Arkanites is a goniatitid ammonite that lived during the Early Pennsylvanian that has been found in Arkansas and Oklahoma in the U.S.

Morphology
The shell of Arkanites is subglobose, rather evolute, with a moderately wide umbilicus and a broadly rounded venter (or rim).  Sculpture consists of well developed umbilical ribbing, sometimes with nodelike bases, and broad, deep, ventrolateral grooves.  The ventral lobe of the suture, which sits on the outer rim, is large, with a median saddle that exceeds half its overall height. The first lateral saddle is broadly rounded, the adventitious lobe is large and pointed.

Taxonomy
Arkanites is possibly derived from Retites and closely related to Quinnites, all which come from the Lower Pennsylvanian (Morrowan). Retites and Quinnites are found together in Arkansas; Arkanites separately in Arkansas and Oklahoma. Retites has also been reported from the southern Urals of Russia and from Inner Mongolia, China.

References

Arkanites in GONIAT Online 6/6/12
Arkanites Paleodb 6/6/12.
W. B. Saunders, D. M. Work, and S. V. Nikolaeva, 1999. Evolution of Complexity in Paleozoic Ammonoid Sutures, Supplementary Material.  Science Magazine

Pennsylvanian ammonites
Goniatitida genera
Reticuloceratidae
Carboniferous ammonites of North America